Hans-Jürgen Cochius (born 3 August 1941) is a German sailor. He competed in the Flying Dutchman event at the 1968 Summer Olympics.

References

External links
 

1941 births
Living people
German male sailors (sport)
Olympic sailors of East Germany
Sailors at the 1968 Summer Olympics – Flying Dutchman
Sportspeople from Berlin